The following terms are used to describe leaf morphology in the description and taxonomy of plants. Leaves may be simple (a single leaf blade or lamina) or compound (with several leaflets). The edge of the leaf may be regular or irregular, may be smooth or bearing hair, bristles or spines. For more terms describing other aspects of leaves besides their overall morphology see the leaf article.

The terms listed here all are supported by technical and professional usage, but they cannot be represented as mandatory or undebatable; readers must use their judgement. Authors often use terms arbitrarily, or coin them to taste, possibly in ignorance of established terms, and it is not always clear whether because of ignorance, or personal preference, or because usages change with time or context, or because of variation between specimens, even specimens from the same plant. For example, whether to call leaves on the same tree "acuminate", "lanceolate", or "linear" could depend on individual judgement, or which part of the tree one collected them from. The same cautions might apply to "caudate", "cuspidate", and "mucronate", or to "crenate", "dentate", and "serrate."

Another problem is to establish definitions that meet all cases or satisfy all authorities and readers. For example, it seems altogether reasonable to define a mucro as "a small sharp point as a continuation of the midrib", but it may not be clear how small is small enough, how sharp is sharp enough, how hard the point must be, and what to call the point when one cannot tell whether the leaf has a midrib at all. Various authors or field workers might come to incompatible conclusions, or might try to compromise by qualifying terms so vaguely that a description of a particular plant practically loses its value.

Use of these terms is not restricted to leaves, but may be applied to morphology of other parts of plants, e.g. bracts, bracteoles, stipules, sepals, petals, carpels or scales. Some of these terms are also used for similar-looking anatomical features on animals.

Leaf structure
Leaves of most plants include a flat structure called the blade or lamina, but not all leaves are flat, some are cylindrical. Leaves may be simple, with a single leaf blade, or compound, with several leaflets. In flowering plants, as well as the blade of the leaf, there may be a petiole and stipules; compound leaves may have a rachis supporting the leaflets. Leaf structure is described by several terms that include:

Leaf and leaflet shapes 
Being one of the more visible features, leaf shape is commonly used for plant identification. Similar terms are used for other plant parts, such as petals, tepals, and bracts.

Edge 
Leaf margins (edges) are frequently used in visual plant identification because they are usually consistent within a species or group of species, and are an easy characteristic to observe. Edge and margin are interchangeable in the sense that they both refer to the outside perimeter of a leaf.

Leaf folding 
Leaves may also be folded, sculpted or rolled in various ways. If the leaves are initially folded in the bud, but later unrolls  it is called vernation, ptyxis is the folding of an individual leaf in a bud.

Latin descriptions
The Latin word for 'leaf', is neuter. In descriptions of a single leaf, the neuter singular ending of the adjective is used, e.g.  'lanceolate leaf',  'linear leaf'. In descriptions of multiple leaves, the neuter plural is used, e.g.  'linear leaves'. Descriptions commonly refer to the plant using the ablative singular or plural, e.g.  'with ovate leaves'.

See also
 Glossary of botanical terms
 Glossary of plant morphology
 Cladophylls are leaf-like petioles
 Leaf size
 Sinus
 Leaflet (botany) and Rachis
 Petiole (botany) and Plant stem
 Phylloclades are flattened stems that resemble leaves
 Pinnation
 Plant morphology
 Taxonomy (biology)

References

Bibliography 

 
 , in 
 , in

External links 
 The Description of Leaves, University of Rochester
 Fairchild Tropical Botanic Garden
 Vplants
 Botany 115 
 The seed site

Leaf morphology
Plant morphology
Leaves
Wikipedia glossaries using tables